Hans Malmström (9 June 1921 – 1994) was a Swedish footballer who played as a defender.

References

External links
Biography of Hans Malmström 

1921 births
1994 deaths
Association football defenders
Swedish footballers
Allsvenskan players
Malmö FF players
Sweden international footballers